Format of entries is:
 ICAO (IATA) – Airport Name – Airport Location

TA - Antigua and Barbuda 

 TAPA (ANU) – VC Bird International Airport – Saint John's, Antigua
 TAPH (BBQ) – Codrington Airport – Codrington, Barbuda
 TAPT – Coco Point Lodge Airport – Coco Point, Barbuda

TB - Barbados 

 TBPB (BGI) – Grantley Adams International Airport – Bridgetown
 TBPO – Bridgetown Heliport – Bridgetown (closed)

TD - Dominica 

 TDCF (DCF) – Canefield Airport – Roseau
 TDPD (DOM) – Douglas-Charles Airport – Marigot

TF - Guadeloupe, Martinique, Saint Barthélemy, Saint Martin (France)

Guadeloupe 

 TFFA (DSD) – La Désirade Airport – Beauséjour, La Désirade
 TFFB (BBR) – Baillif Airport – Baillif, Basse-Terre
 TFFC (SFC) – Saint-François Airport – Saint-François, Grande-Terre
 TFFM (GBJ) – Marie-Galante Airport – Grand-Bourg, Marie-Galante
 TFFR (PTP) – Pointe-à-Pitre - Le Raizet Airport – Pointe-à-Pitre, Grande-Terre
 TFFS (LSS) – Les Saintes Airport – Terre-de-Haut, Les Saintes

Martinique

 TFFF (FDF) – Fort-de-France - Le Lamentin Airport – Le Lamentin, Fort-de-France

Saint Barthélemy 

 TFFJ (SBH) – Gustaf III Airport – St. Jean

Saint Martin (France) 

Note: For the Dutch southern half of the island, known as Sint Maarten, see TN - Netherlands Antilles

 TFFG (SFG) – L'Espérance Airport – Grand Case

TG - Grenada 

 TGPG – Pearls Airport – Grenville
 TGPY (GND) – Maurice Bishop International Airport – St. George's
 TGPZ (CRU) – Lauriston Airport (Carriacou Island Airport) – Hillsborough, Carriacou Island

TI - U.S. Virgin Islands 

 TIST (STT) – Cyril E. King Airport – St. Thomas
 TISX (STX) – Henry E. Rohlsen Airport  – St. Croix

TJ - Puerto Rico 

 TJAB (ARE) – Antonio (Nery) Juarbe Pol Airport – Arecibo
 TJBQ (BQN) – Rafael Hernández Airport – Aquadilla
 TJCP (CPX) – Benjamin Rivera Noriega Airport – Culebra
 TJFA (FAJ) – Diego Jimenez Torres Airport – Fajardo
 TJFF – Ramey Air Force Base – Aguadilla (closed, reopened as Rafael Hernández Airport)
 TJIG (SIG) – Fernando Ribas Dominicci Airport (Isla Grande Airport) – San Juan
 TJMZ (MAZ) – Eugenio María de Hostos Airport – Mayagüez
 TJNR (NRR) – Roosevelt Roads Naval Station – Ceiba (closed, reopened as José Aponte de la Torre Airport)
 TJPS (PSE) – Mercedita Airport – Ponce
 TJRV (NRR) – José Aponte de la Torre Airport – Ceiba
 TJSJ (SJU) – Luis Muñoz Marín International Airport – San Juan
 TJVQ (VQS) – Vieques Airport (Antonio Rivera Rodríguez Airport) – Vieques

TK - Saint Kitts and Nevis 

 TKPK (SKB) – Robert L. Bradshaw International Airport – Basseterre, Saint Kitts
 TKPN (NEV) – Vance W. Amory International Airport – Charlestown, Nevis

TL - Saint Lucia 

 TLPC (SLU) – George F. L. Charles Airport (formerly Vigie Airport) – Castries, Saint Lucia
 TLPL (UVF) – Hewanorra International Airport – Vieux-Fort, Saint Lucia

TN - Caribbean Netherlands, Aruba, Curaçao and Sint Maarten 

Code originally used for the Netherlands Antilles and remained active after the secession of Aruba in 1986 and the dissolution of the Netherlands Antilles in 2010.

Caribbean Netherlands 

 TNCB (BON) – Flamingo International Airport – Kralendijk, Bonaire
 TNCE (EUX) – F.D. Roosevelt Airport – Sint Eustatius
 TNCS (SAB) – Juancho E. Yrausquin Airport – Saba

Aruba 

 TNCA (AUA) – Queen Beatrix International Airport – Oranjestad, Aruba

Curaçao 

 TNCC (CUR) – Hato International Airport – Willemstad, Curaçao,

Sint Maarten 

Note: Sint Maarten is the Dutch southern half of the island of Saint Martin. For the French northern side, see TF - Saint Martin

 TNCM (SXM) – Princess Juliana International Airport – Philipsburg, Sint Maarten

TQ - Anguilla 

 TQPF (AXA) – Clayton J. Lloyd International Airport – The Valley

TR - Montserrat 

 TRPG (MNI) – John A. Osborne Airport – Gerald's Park
 TRPM (MNI) – W.H. Bramble Airport (Blackburne) – Plymouth (closed)

TT - Trinidad and Tobago 

 TTCP (TAB) – Arthur Napoleon Raymond Robinson International Airport  – Scarborough, Tobago
 TTPP (POS) – Piarco International Airport – Port of Spain, Trinidad

TU - British Virgin Islands 

 TUPA (NGD) – Auguste George Airport – Anegada
 TUPJ (EIS) – Terrance B. Lettsome International Airport – Beef Island / Tortola
 TUPW (VIJ) – Virgin Gorda Airport – Virgin Gorda

TV - Saint Vincent and the Grenadines 

 TVSA (SVD) Argyle International Airport - Argyle,  Saint Vincent
 TVSB (BQU) – J.F. Mitchell Airport – Bequia, Grenadines
 TVSC (CIW) – Canouan Airport – Canouan, Grenadines
 TVSM (MQS) – Mustique Airport – Mustique, Grenadines
 TVSU (UNI) – Union Island Airport – Union Island, Grenadines
 TVSV (SVD) – E.T. Joshua Airport – Arnos Vale, Saint Vincent (closed)

TX - Bermuda 

 TXKF (BDA) – L. F. Wade International Airport – Ferry Reach

References

 
  - includes IATA codes
 Aviation Safety Network - IATA and ICAO airport codes

T
Aviation in the Caribbean
Airport by ICAO code
Airports